Les D. Bartlett (born 27 September 1949) is a former Australian rules footballer.  He played with Footscray, now known as the Western Bulldogs, in the Victorian Football League (VFL) mostly as a half-back flanker.  He was recruited from Katandra in the Picola & District Football League.  His playing measurements were 188 cm and 88 kg, which for the time would have been considered tall for a flanker.

Bartlett only managed 60 senior games in eight seasons, indicating that he was never consistently part of Footscray's best 20 players.

References
Holmesby, Russell & Main, Jim (2002) The Encyclopedia of AFL Footballers, Crown Content, Melbourne.

External links

Western Bulldogs players
Australian rules footballers from Victoria (Australia)
1949 births
Living people